Fondu Fyre, sometimes called Fondue Fyre, is a refractory concrete developed for specialist application. Fondu Fyre is a heat and erosion resistant concrete developed during the Apollo space program. It was developed to withstand the supersonic plume of a rocket engine during launch and hot-fire tests .

Allied Mineral Products based in Ohio holds the registered trademark on the name Fondu Fyre.

Uses
The concrete is used in 2 different mixtures called WA-1 and XB-1. The XB-1 is used as a more fire and erosion resistant layer for covering WA-1 in areas which are directly exposed to the exhaust flame of a rocket engine.
The concrete is used on the launch pads of the Kennedy Space Center on the flame deflectors.

Damage
Fondue Fyre was used to repair the damage done on May 31, 2008 to launchpad 39A during the launch of the Space Shuttle Discovery on mission STS-124. After subsequent launch of Space Shuttle Atlantis for mission STS-125 on May 11, 2009 a 25 square metre section of the Fondue Fyre on pad 39A was found to have been damaged by exhaust from the Solid Rocket Booster.

References

Design handbook for protection of launch complexes from solid propellant exhaust - march 1966 - NASA -Dead Link
Refractory Materials for Flame Deflector Protection System Corrosion Control: Similar Industries and/or Launch Facilities Survey - January 2009 - NASA

External links
 http://spaceflightnow.com/shuttle/sts124/080626paddamage/
 http://www.spaceref.com/news/viewsr.html?pid=31220

Concrete
Thermal protection